is a Japanese voice actress from Nagano Prefecture who is affiliated with Across Entertainment. After graduating from acting school, she made her voice acting debut as the character Yurika Nijino in the anime series Invaders of the Rokujouma!?. She is also known for her roles as Asahi Kuga in Seven Senses of the Re'Union and Yurine Hanazono in Dropkick on My Devil!

Early life and career
Ōmori was born in Nagano Prefecture on October 15, 1994. As a child, she learned to play the piano at the age of two, and she had an interest in anime series such as Sailor Moon; while in kindergarten, she frequently imitated the character Sailor Moon, and "wished to become a magical girl". She would also watch Gundam with her four older brothers, but she would not consider herself a fan of the series until she reached junior high school. She had a desire to participate in a school play production of Journey to the West, but her teacher would tell her to try out narration and speech contests instead.

During her junior high school years, Ōmori went to Victoria, British Columbia for studies. It was during her time in Canada when she decided to become a voice actress. After returning to Japan, she enrolled in an acting school run by the talent agency Pro-Fit. Following her graduation from the school, she joined the talent agency Link Plan. In 2014, she made her debut as a voice actress, playing the role of Yurika Nijino in the anime series Invaders of the Rokujouma!?

Ōmori would continue playing main or supporting roles in anime, such as Noa Sakura in Pan de Peace!, Chiri Tsukikawa in PriPara, and Chiya Sakagami in Mahou Shoujo Nante Mouiidesukara. In 2018, she played the roles of Hina Kiga in Seven Senses of the Re'Union and Yurine Hanazono in Dropkick on My Devil!. She, together with her Dropkick on My Devil! co-stars, also performed the series' opening theme .

On March 1, 2021, she transferred to Across Entertainment.

Filmography

Anime
2014
Invaders of the Rokujouma!? (Yurika Nijino)
Monthly Girls' Nozaki-kun (Women's basketball club member)
Nobunaga Concerto (Mori Rikimaru)

2015
Sky Wizards Academy (Coela Viper)
Cross Ange (Marika)
Castle Town Dandelion (Chika)
World Break: Aria of Curse for a Holy Swordsman (Yuri Oregvitch Zhirkov)
Battle Spirits (Okuni Midoriyama, Kinoto)

2016
Pandora in the Crimson Shell: Ghost Urn
First Love Monster (Yui Nakamura)
Rainbow Days (Aya Ōno)
Pan de Peace (Noa Sakura)
Hundred (LiZA)
PriPara (Chiri Tsukikawa)
Mahou Shoujo Nante Mouiidesukara (Chiya Sakagami)

2018
Seven Senses of the Re'Union (Asahi Kuga)
Dropkick on My Devil! (Yurine Hanazono)
Armor Shop for Ladies & Gentlemen (Mokuku)

2019
How Clumsy you are, Miss Ueno (Mizuna Tanaka)
Rainy Cocoa side G

2020
Darwin's Game (Rain Kashiwagi)
Science Fell in Love, So I Tried to Prove It (Ena Ibarada)
Dropkick on My Devil!! Dash (Yurine Hanazono)
 Kiratto Pri☆Chan (Melpan)
 Super HxEros (Chacha)

2021
Farewell, My Dear Cramer (Kei Hanabusa)

2022
She Professed Herself Pupil of the Wise Man (Mira/Dunbalf Gandagore/Sakimori Kagami)
Science Fell in Love, So I Tried to Prove It r=1-sinθ (Ena Ibarada)
My Isekai Life (Higesura)
Dropkick on My Devil!! X (Yurine Hanazono)
Do It Yourself!! (Jobko)

Video games
Granado Espada (Charlotte)
Kirara Fantasia (Harumi Hosono)
Moe! Ninja Girls RPG (Iori Natsume)
Crash Fever (Xibalba)
Girls' Frontline (Chauchat), (Six12)
Crash Team Racing Nitro-Fueled (Yaya Panda)
Azur Lane (Impero)

References

External links
Agency profile 

1994 births
Across Entertainment voice actors
Japanese voice actresses
Living people
Voice actresses from Nagano Prefecture